Alfred Lewis "Smacker" Blair (23 January 1896 – 28 September 1944) was an Australian rugby league footballer and coach whose playing career ran from 1917 to 1930 with South Sydney. A skilled , he made a single appearance for the Australian national team in 1924.

Club career
Blair played his club football career with South Sydney, whom he captained to premiership victories in 1925 (undefeated), 1926, 1927 and 1929. He was the 1927 NSWRFL season's top point scorer and was captain-coach of the South Sydney club that year. He took a year off from Sydney football in 1928 when he traveled to Queensland to captain-coach Longreach. He returned to Souths for his final playing year in 1929, winning a premiership and leading the side on the first tour of New Zealand by a Sydney club team.

After finishing his Sydney career with Souths, he captain-coached the Waratah-Mayfield club in Newcastle in 1931. He finished his career at Cooma before returning to Sydney.

Blair played 167 first grade games for the South Sydney club between 1917 and 1930 scoring 37 tries and 120 goals for a total of 351 points. The noted journalist Claude Corbett said of him, "He was beyond doubt the finest rugby league captain Sydney club football has ever known. He had an uncanny intuition of positional play."

Representative career
Blair played seven games for the New South Wales rugby league team in 1919 and 1927. He also played one test match for Australia against the touring Great Britain team in 1924. He is listed on the Australian Players Register as Kangaroo No. 128.

Post-playing
Blair coached Western Suburbs for the 1943 NSWRFL season, after which he was succeeded by Henry Bolewski. He then coached South Sydney for the 1944 NSWRFL season.

Blair had just completed the season coaching his old club when he died suddenly at his Coogee home on 28 September 1944. Up until his death, he was a popular steward at the NSW Leagues Club, and became ill at work a few days before he died. He was survived by his son, Alf. A large funeral was held for Smacker at St. Brigid's Church, Coogee where many past and present members of the South Sydney District Rugby League Football club were present. He was buried at Botany Cemetery on 30 September 1944.

References

Sources
 Andrews, Malcolm. The ABC of Rugby League. Australia: ABC Books, 2006.
 Whiticker, Alan & Hudson, Glen (2006) The Encyclopedia of Rugby League Players, Gavin Allen Publishing, Sydney
 Whiticker, Alan & Collis, Ian (2006) The History of Rugby League Clubs, New Holland, Sydney

1896 births
1944 deaths
Australia national rugby league team players
Australian rugby league coaches
Australian rugby league players
Burials at Eastern Suburbs Memorial Park
Rugby league five-eighths
Rugby league players from Sydney
South Sydney Rabbitohs captains
South Sydney Rabbitohs coaches
South Sydney Rabbitohs players
Western Suburbs Magpies coaches